Time After Time is an American period drama/science fiction television series that aired on ABC from March 5 to March 26, 2017. The series, developed by Kevin Williamson, is based on the 1979 novel of the same name by Karl Alexander and was commissioned on May 12, 2016.  ABC removed the series from its schedule after broadcasting five episodes. However, all 12 episodes have been broadcast in Spain, Portugal, South Africa and Australia. In addition, as of February 2019, all 12 episodes can be viewed streaming on CW Seed.

Cast
 Freddie Stroma as H. G. Wells, a 19th-century author and intellectual who invented a time machine and travels to 2017 to capture John.
 Josh Bowman as John Stevenson/Jack the Ripper, a London surgeon and Wells's friend who is secretly a notorious serial killer, and escapes, using Wells's time machine, to 2017.
 Genesis Rodriguez as Jane Walker, assistant curator of the New York Metropolitan Museum.
 Nicole Ari Parker as Vanessa Anders, a wealthy philanthropist and Wells's great-great-granddaughter.
 Jennifer Ferrin as Brooke Monroe, a neuropathologist with an interest in Stevenson.
 Will Chase as Griffin Monroe, a politician romantically involved with Vanessa Anders, who has a secret agenda regarding Wells's time machine. He is Brooke Monroe's brother.

Episodes
With the exception of the pilot, each episode is named after a phrase in the song "Time After Time" by Cyndi Lauper, which was named after the 1979 film of the same name. The film itself was based on the novel of the same name used as the source material of the series.

Reception

The series has received mixed reviews from critics. The review aggregator website Rotten Tomatoes reported a 67% approval rating with an average rating of 6.29/10 based on 30 reviews. The website's consensus reads, "Time After Time employs its central narrative gimmick to ill effect, leaving a charming cast stranded in a stream of tedious storylines." Metacritic, which uses a weighted average, assigned a score of 59 out of 100 based on 24 reviews, indicating "mixed or average reviews".

Sonia Saraiya, writing in Variety, felt that despite an engaging lead performance the series failed to live up to its "fun" potential, and raised strident objections to its style of violence: "the studied shallowness of Time After Time’s approach to violence makes for a sickening dynamic that attempts to cheaply humanize a serial killer. And while a shallow look at violence might be all that broadcast television’s standards and practices will allow, it feels both flat and exploitative."

See also
 The Time Machine, 1895 novella by H. G. Wells

References

External links
 
 

American Broadcasting Company original programming
2017 American television series debuts
2017 American television series endings
2010s American drama television series
2010s American science fiction television series
2010s American time travel television series
English-language television shows
Television series set in the 19th century
Live action television shows based on films
Television series by Warner Bros. Television Studios
Television shows based on American novels
Television series about Jack the Ripper
Cultural depictions of H. G. Wells
Television series created by Kevin Williamson